Tullamore Town F.C. is an Irish association football club based in Tullamore, County Offaly, playing their home games at Leah Victoria Park. Their senior men's team currently play in Leinster Senior League. They have previously played in the A Championship and the League of Ireland B Division.

Honours
FAI Intermediate Cup: 1
1970–71
Leinster Senior League Tom Cullen Cup: 2
2013–14, 2014–15

2015–16 squad

Notable former players
Republic of Ireland under-21 internationals
  Seamus Kelly

Republic of Ireland women's internationals
  Sylvia Gee

Staff and board members

 President :  Mr P Nicholson
 Chairman:  Mr Alan Kelly
 Club Secretary :  Mr Daniel O'Brien
 Treasurer :  Mr L Francis
First team Manager:  Tony O'Sullivan

External links
Official website

Association football clubs in Leinster
A Championship teams
Leinster Senior League (association football) clubs
League of Ireland B Division clubs
Sport in Tullamore
1941 establishments in Ireland
Association football clubs established in 1941
Sports clubs in County Offaly